This is a list of Elgin City Football Club seasons from 1895–96, when Elgin City were admitted to the Highland League, to the present day. The list details Elgin's record in major league and cup competitions, and the club's top league goal scorer of each season where available. Top scorers in bold were also the top scorers in Elgin's division that season. Records of competitions such as the North of Scotland Cup are not included.

The club was founded in 1893 and originally played in the Highland Football League. In 2000 the club was elected to the Scottish Football League along with Peterhead F.C.

Key

Key to divisions
 Highland League – Highland Football League
 Third Division – Scottish Football League Third Division
 League Two – Scottish League Two
Key to positions and symbols
  – Champions
  – Runners-up
  – 3rd place
  – Promoted
  – Relegated

Key to rounds
GS – Group stage
R1 – Round 1, etc.
QF – Quarter-finals
SF – Semi-finals
 – Runners-up
 – Winners

Seasons
This list is incomplete; you can help by adding missing items with reliable sources.

Notes

League performance summary 

 115 total seasons (including 2021–22)
 22 seasons in Scottish Professional Football League / Scottish Football League
 91 seasons in Highland Football League
 2 seasons in Banffshire & District Football League

References

Seasons
 
Elgin City